Lockwood is the surname of:

People
Amos D. Lockwood (1811–1884), American engineer and manufacturer
Annea Lockwood (born 1939), New Zealand-born American composer
Belva Ann Lockwood (1830–1917), American feminist, lawyer and politician
Benoni Lockwood III (1805–1851), American clipper ship captain
Betty Lockwood (1924–2019), British political activist
Bobby Lockwood, British actor
Cara Lockwood, American writer
Charles Lockwood (disambiguation), several people
Daniel N. Lockwood (1844–1906), American politician
Dave Lockwood (tiddlywinks) (born 1952/53), American tiddlywinks champion
David Lockwood (sociologist) (1929–2014), British sociologist
David J. Lockwood, Canadian physicist
Didier Lockwood (1956–2018), French jazz violinist
Dorothy Lockwood (1910–1991), British painter
Eliphalet Lockwood (deacon) (1675–1753), deacon, and member of the Connecticut House of Representatives
Eliphalet Lockwood (1741–1814), American Revolutionary War captain, and member of the Connecticut House of Representatives
Gary Lockwood (born 1937), American actor
George Lockwood (born 1872), Australian footballer
George Lockwood (politician) (born 1862), mayor of Norwalk, Connecticut
Gerald Lockwood (1928–2015), rugby league footballer
Guy H. Lockwood (1870–1947), American political activist and cartoonist
Harold Lockwood (1887–1918), American silent film actor
Henry Francis Lockwood (1811–1878), English architect 
Henry Hayes Lockwood (1814–1899), American soldier
James Lockwood (disambiguation) 
Jess Lockwood (bull rider) (born 1997), American professional bull rider 
Joseph Lockwood (1904–1991), British industrialist and chairman of EMI
Kyle Lockwood (born 1977), New Zealand architect and designer of the Lockwood silver fern flag
Lockwood Smith (born 1948), New Zealand politician
Lorna E. Lockwood (1903–1977), American jurist
Luke Vincent Lockwood (1872–1951), American author of books on classic furniture design
Margaret Lockwood (1916–1990), British actress
Matthew Lockwood (born 1976), English footballer
Michael Lockwood (disambiguation), a list of people named Michael or Mike Lockwood
Nadine Lockwood (1991–1996), American murder victim
Normand Lockwood (1906–2002), American composer
Patricia A. Lockwood, American politician
Preston Lockwood (1912–1996), English actor
Robert Lockwood, Jr. (1915–2006), American blues musician
Samuel D. Lockwood (1789–1874), American lawyer and politician
 Stuart Lockwood, British boy kept hostage by Saddam Hussein during the Gulf war
 Thomas Lockwood (disambiguation)
 Todd Lockwood (born 1957), American fantasy and science fiction artist
 Ward Lockwood (1894–1963), American artist 
 William Lockwood (disambiguation), a list of people named William, Will, Bill or Billy Lockwood

Fictional characters
Mr Lockwood, in Emily Brontë's 1847 novel Wuthering Heights
Jonah Lockwood, serial killer alter ego of Whitney scion Keith Whitney from the soap opera The Edge of Night
Lockwood, in the 2004 play The History Boys
Anthony Lockwood, from Jonathan Stroud's YA series Lockwood & Co
Flint Lockwood, from the film Cloudy With a Chance of Meatballs

See also
Justice Lockwood (disambiguation)

English-language surnames